Per Schöldberg (born 1962) is a Swedish politician. From March 2019 to September 2022, he served as Member of the Riksdag representing the constituency of Kronoberg County. He became a member after Eskil Erlandsson resigned.

References 

Living people
1962 births
Place of birth missing (living people)
Members of the Riksdag from the Centre Party (Sweden)
Members of the Riksdag 2018–2022
21st-century Swedish politicians